Daylight Storms is an album by the English group Air Formation. It was released on the label Club AC30 on 12 February 2007.

Track listing
 "Cold Morning" – 5:18
 "Tidal" – 4:15
 "Daylight Storms" – 4:52
 "I Can't Remember Waking Up" – 3:54
 "Into View" – 4:31
 "Formation 1" – 4:41
 "You Have to Go Somewhere" – 6:29
 "Adrift" – 3:18
 "The Dark Has Fallen" – 5:43
 "Before We Forget" – 7:34

References

2007 albums
Air Formation albums